Banard Ervin Hafen (November 20, 1921 – October 25, 2012) was an American football player who played at the defensive end and end positions.

College football
A native of Santa Clara, Utah, he played college football for the Utah Redskins. In October 1948, after recovering two fumbles and playing a great defensive game against Wyoming, he was selected by the Associated Press as the national lineman of the week. He was described by Bill Coltrin of the Salt Lake Telegram as "one of the greatest ends in Utah football history."

Professional football
He was selected by the Detroit Lions in the 19th round (167th overall pick) of the 1948 NFL Draft. The New York Yankees of the AAFC also recruited Hafen, but he signed with the Lions in January 1949. He played for the Lions during the 1949 and 1950 seasons and appeared in a total of 24 NFL games. While with the Lions, he trained in the off-season by "bull-dogging and roping cattle" on his family's ranch in Utah.

References

1921 births
2012 deaths
Detroit Lions players
Utah Utes football players
Players of American football from Utah
People from Santa Clara, Utah